Alsophila cunninghamii, synonym Cyathea cunninghamii, also known as the gully tree fern and slender tree fern, is a species of tree fern indigenous to New Zealand including North Island (type locality), South Island and Chatham Islands; also to Victoria, possibly New South Wales, southeastern Queensland and Tasmania in Australia. It grows in damp forest, often emerging from stream gullies and riverbanks. Brownsey noted that it has a lower tolerance for drought than other related species. The erect trunk may be 20 m tall and is usually 6–15 cm in diameter, occasionally as much as 20 cm. Fronds are tri- to tetrapinnate and 3 m or more in length. The rachis and stipe are slender, black brown, warty and covered with brown scales. Sori occur along each side of the pinnule midvein and are covered by hood-like indusia. A. cunninghamii is an uncommon and slow-growing tree fern.

Plants from New Caledonia known as Alsophila stelligera may represent the same species.

In the wild, A. cunninghamii hybridises with Alsophila australis to form the fertile hybrid Alsophila × marcescens.

To do well in cultivation, A. cunninghamii requires moisture. Rich humus is a good growing medium. Plants should be protected from the wind.

The specific epithet cunninghamii commemorates Allan Cunningham (1791-1839), a botanist who traveled widely in Australia and New Zealand.

References

External links
 Cyathea cunninghamii  
 Cyathea cunninghamii Hook.f. 
 Cyathea cunninghamii "Slender Treefern" 
Cyathea cunninghamii 

cunninghamii
Flora of New South Wales
Flora of Queensland
Flora of Tasmania
Flora of Victoria (Australia)
Flora of New Zealand
Flora of the Chatham Islands
Ferns of New Zealand
Ferns of Australia
Rare flora of Australia
Plants described in 1854